AT&S also known as AT & S Austria Technologie & Systemtechnik Aktiengesellschaft designs and manufactures high-end printed circuit boards
 and substrates for semiconductors. The company is listed on the Vienna Stock Exchange.

In Austria are two production sites in Leoben and Fehring, in India is one in Nanjangud and in China are two in Shanghai and Chongqing and in Korea is one in Ansan

Products, Customers & Business Units 

AT&S is a supplier for following companies:
Apple (Mobile Devices & Substrates): AT&S was 2015 and 2016 among the Top 200 worldwide suppliers of Apple 
Fairphone: 2015. AT&S became supplier of Fairphone.
Sony Ericsson: AT&S obtained suppliers award by Sony-Ericson 2017

AT&S is supporting the current roll-out of the 5G mobile communications generation with high frequency (HF) optimized interconnect solutions by developing and producing hybrid-PCB structures

References

External links 

 Vienna Stock Exchange: Market Data AT&S AG

Technology companies of Austria
Companies listed on the Wiener Börse
Electronics companies of Austria
Economy of Styria